Gravel Hill or Gravel Hill Plantation may refer to:

in Canada
Gravel Hill, New Brunswick, Canada

in the United Kingdom
Gravel Hill tram stop, London light rail stop

in the United States

Gravel Hill, Delaware, an unincorporated community
Gravel Hill, Indiana, an unincorporated community
Gravel Hill, Missouri, an unincorporated community
Gravel Hill, New Jersey, an unincorporated community
Gravel Hill Plantation (Allendale, South Carolina)
Gravel Hill Plantation (Hampton, South Carolina)
Gravel Hill, Buckingham County, Virginia
Gravel Hill (Charlotte Court House, Virginia) (a plantation house)